Rob Kearney is an American professional strongman competitor. He has won Giants Live and the Arnold International World Series Australia, and qualified three times for the World's Strongest Man competition.

Kearney is the first out gay strongman, calling himself the "world's strongest gay". He lives near Springfield, Massachusetts with his husband Joey.

In 2022, Hachette Book Group published Strong, a children's picture book about Kearney's journey and identity. The book was the result of a collaboration with  author and LGBTQ+ activist Eric Rosswood.

Kearney is an ambassador for fitness clothing brand Gymshark.

References

External links
Official site

American strength athletes
American LGBT sportspeople
Year of birth missing (living people)
Living people